Smokey Creek Township is a small township in Burke County, North Carolina, close to the Caldwell County line.

External links

Townships in Burke County, North Carolina
Townships in North Carolina